Psycho City is a 1992 album released by the American hard rock band Great White. It may also refer to:

 "Psycho City", a song by Great White the album of the same name
 "Psycho City", a song by Quiet Riot from Terrified